The "Blood in the Water" match ( lit. Blood bath of Melbourne) was a water polo match between Hungary and the USSR at the 1956 Melbourne Olympics. The match took place on 6 December 1956 against the background of the 1956 Hungarian Revolution, and saw Hungary defeat the USSR 4–0. The name was coined after Hungarian player Ervin Zádor emerged during the last two minutes with blood pouring from above his eye after being punched by Soviet player Valentin Prokopov.

Background 

Tensions were already high between the Hungarian and Soviet water polo teams, as the Soviets had taken advantage of their political control of Hungary to study and copy the training methods and tactics of the Olympic champion Hungarians.

Then, on 23 October 1956, a demonstration by students of the Budapest University of Technology and Economics escalated into an uprising against the government in Budapest. On 1 November, Soviet tanks began rolling into Hungary and from 4 to 10 November forces began suppressing the uprising with air strikes, artillery bombardments, and tank-infantry actions.

At the time, the Hungarian water polo team was in a mountain training camp above Budapest. They were able to hear the gunfire and see smoke rising. The players were the defending Olympic champions; with the Summer Olympics in Melbourne two months away, they were moved into Czechoslovakia to avoid being caught in the revolution. The players only learned of the true extent of the uprising and the subsequent crackdown after arriving in Australia and they were all anxious for news of friends and family.

By the start of the Olympics, the uprising had been suppressed and many players saw the Olympics as a way to salvage pride for their country. "We felt we were playing not just for ourselves but for our whole country", said Zádor after the match. The match was played in front of a partisan crowd bolstered with expatriate Hungarians as well as Australians and Americans, two of the Soviet Union's Cold War opponents.

The match 

The Hungarians had created a strategy before the game to taunt the Russians, whose language they had studied in school. In the words of Ervin Zádor: "We had decided to try and make the Russians angry to distract them."

From the beginning, kicks and punches were exchanged. At one point, a punch thrown by Hungarian captain Dezső Gyarmati was caught on film.

With one minute remaining in the match, Hungary was leading 4–0. Zádor was marking Valentin Prokopov, with whom he had already exchanged words, and a whistle was blown. In the intermission, Prokopov struck him, causing a bleeding gash. Zádor left the pool; his bleeding was the final straw for a crowd already in frenzy.  Many angry spectators jumped onto the concourse beside the water, shook their fists, shouted abuse and spat at the Russians. To avoid a riot, police entered the arena and shepherded the crowd away.

Pictures of Zádor's injuries were published around the world, leading to the "Blood in the Water" moniker. Reports that the water in the pool turned red were, however, an exaggeration. Zádor said his only thought was whether he would be able to play the next match.

The referees stopped the match; Hungary was declared the winner since they had been leading.  Hungary then beat Yugoslavia 2–1 in the final to win their fourth Olympic gold medal. Zádor's injury forced him to miss the match. After the event was completed, he and some of his teammates defected to the West.

In film 
In 2006, for the 50th anniversary of the attempted Hungarian Revolution, the documentary Freedom's Fury, produced by Kristine Lacey and Thor Halvorssen, told the story of the match. Quentin Tarantino described it as "the best untold story ever".  The documentary was narrated by the Olympic swimmer Mark Spitz, who, as a teenager had been coached by Ervin Zádor.

Also in 2006, a feature film about the match was released, entitled Children of Glory (Hungarian title: Szabadság, szerelem, meaning "Freedom, love", after the lines of Sándor Petőfi, the martyred poet of the 1848–49 revolution). The movie shows the Hungarian Revolution through the eyes of a player on the water polo team and a young woman who is one of the student leaders. It was directed by Krisztina Goda, and produced by Andrew G. Vajna. The movie appeared in Hungarian cinemas on 23 October 2006, the 50th anniversary of the revolution. On 29 October 2006, it was shown at the White House for President George W. Bush and guests (including Hungarian-American figures such as George Pataki, Governor of New York, and George A. Olah, Nobel Prize winner).

The incident is also featured in the 1978 Australian film Newsfront.

References

External links 
 Article in Radio Free Europe
 Article in New York Times
 Website on Hungarian 1956 Olympic team
 Report of the match at Stoneridge water polo website. 
 Freedom's Fury website 
 Freedom's Fury trailer on YouTube

Water polo at the 1956 Summer Olympics
Water polo matches
History of water polo
Water polo in Hungary
Water polo in Russia
Olympic Games controversies
Brawls in team sports
December 1956 sports events in Australia
1956 in international relations
Hungarian Revolution of 1956
Hungary–Soviet Union relations
Politics and sports
Nicknamed sporting events